The Wrong Mr. Perkins is a 1931 British short comedy film directed by Arthur Varney and starring Herbert Mundin, John Stuart and Frederick Volpe. The screenplay concerns an impoverished man, Jimmy Perkins, who is mistaken by a banker for a wealthy man with a similar name.

Cast
 Herbert Mundin - Jimmy Perkins
 John Stuart - Larry Byrne
 Frederick Volpe - Sir Trevor Petersham
 Percy Walsh - Mr Mellows

References

Bibliography
 Shafer, Stephen C. British popular films, 1929-1939: The Cinema of Reassurance. Routledge, 1997.

External links

1931 films
1931 comedy films
1930s English-language films
Films directed by Arthur Varney
British comedy films
British black-and-white films
1930s British films